Wirimai Juwawo (born November 7, 1980) is a Zimbabwean long-distance runner. At the 2012 Summer Olympics, he competed in the Men's marathon, finishing in 15th place.

References

Zimbabwean male long-distance runners
Zimbabwean male marathon runners
Living people
Olympic athletes of Zimbabwe
Athletes (track and field) at the 2012 Summer Olympics
Athletes (track and field) at the 2016 Summer Olympics
People from Rusape
1980 births
Sportspeople from Manicaland Province